Xanthocaecilius quillayute is a species of lizard barklouse in the family Caeciliusidae. It is found in North America.

References

Further reading

 

Caeciliusidae